Eugen Ludwig Müller (tr. ; 25 September 1867 – 11 May 1939), better known as Yevgeny Miller, was a Russian general of Baltic German origin and one of the leaders of the anticommunist White Army during and after the Russian Civil War (1917–1922). After the civil war he lived in exile in France. Kidnapped by Soviet intelligence operatives in Paris in 1937, he was smuggled to the USSR and executed in Moscow in 1939.

Early life
Miller was a career officer born to a Baltic German aristocratic family in Dünaburg (now Daugavpils, Latvia). After he graduated from the General Staff Academy, he served with the Russian Imperial Guard. Between 1898 and 1907, he was a Russian military attaché in several European capitals, such as Rome, The Hague and Brussels. During the First World War, he headed the Moscow Military District and the 26th Army Corps and was promoted to the rank of lieutenant general.

Civil War
After the February Revolution of 1917, Miller opposed "democratization" of the Russian army and was arrested by his own soldiers after he ordered them to remove red armbands.

After the October Revolution of 1917, Miller fled to Archangelsk and was declared Governor-General of Northern Russia. In May 1919, Admiral Kolchak appointed him to replace Vladimir Marouchevsky in charge of the White Army in the region. In Archangelsk, Murmansk and Olonets, his anti-Bolshevik  Northern Army was supported by the Triple Entente, mostly British forces. However, after an unsuccessful advance against the Red Army along the Northern Dvina in the summer of 1919, British forces withdrew from the region, and Miller's men faced the enemy alone.

Exile

In February 1920, General Miller with 800 refugees sailed from Archangelsk to Tromsø, Norway. Later, he moved to France and, together with Grand Duke Nicholas and Pyotr Nikolayevich Wrangel, continued his anticommunist activism.

Between 1930 and 1937, Miller served as chairman of the Russian All-Military Union (ROVS), an organization of exiled former White Army officers and soldiers opposed to the Soviet Union. His niece Nathalie Sergueiew also fled to France and subsequently became an MI5 agent. As the ROVS chairman, Miller was not an influential figure, as he did not belong to the dominant clan in the ROVS, namely former members of the White Army of South Russia, nor the former ″Gallipoli campers″.

Illegal rendition
On 22 September 1937, NKVD agent and All-Military Union counter-intelligence chief Nikolai Skoblin led Miller to a Paris safe house, ostensibly to meet with two German Abwehr agents, who were in fact officers of the Soviet NKVD disguised as Germans. They drugged Miller, placed him in a steamer trunk and smuggled him aboard a Soviet ship in Le Havre. 

Miller had left behind a note to be opened in case he failed to return from the meeting. In it, he detailed his suspicions about Skoblin. French police launched a massive manhunt, but Skoblin fled to the Soviet embassy in Paris and eventually was smuggled to Barcelona, where the Second Spanish Republic refused to extradite him to France.

However, the French authorities arrested Skoblin's wife, Nadezhda Plevitskaya, and a French court convicted her and sentenced her to 20 years in prison.

The NKVD successfully smuggled Miller back to Moscow, where he was tortured and summarily shot nineteen months later on 11 May 1939, aged 71. NKVD agent Pavel Sudoplatov later claimed that "[Miller's] kidnapping was a cause célèbre. Eliminating him disrupted his organization of Tsarist officers and effectively prevented them from collaborating with the Germans against us." Sudoplatov also claimed that Western accounts of NKVD agent Leonid Eitingon having played a role in the abduction of Miller are false.

Copies of letters written by Miller while imprisoned in Moscow are in the Dmitri Volkogonov papers at the Library of Congress.

See also
 List of people who disappeared
 Mikhail Kvetsinsky, Miller's chief of staff
 North Russia Intervention
 Russian All-Military Union
 White movement

Notes and citations

References

Books
 
 Barmine, Alexander, One Who Survived, New York: G.P. Putnam's Sons (1945)
 Orlov, Alexander, The March of Time, St. Ermin's Press (2004), 
Quinlivian, Peter (2006). Forgotten Valour: The Story of Arthur Sullivan VC. Sydney: New Holland. .

External links

1867 births
1930s missing person cases
1939 deaths
Military personnel from Daugavpils
People from Dvinsky Uyezd
Baltic-German people
Executed Latvian people
Executed military personnel
Executed Russian people
Great Purge victims from Latvia
Kidnapped politicians
Kidnapped Russian people
Missing person cases in France
People of the Russian Civil War
Russian All-Military Union members
Imperial Russian Army generals
Russian people of World War I
Russian politicians
Russian torture victims
White movement generals
White Russian emigrants to France
White Russian emigrants to Norway